Broster, Broster! was the Sveriges Television's Christmas calendar and Sveriges Radio's Christmas Calendar in 1971.

Plot 
The Wikmansson family consists of Linda, the mother, Ludde, the father, as well as their daughter Agnes, the adoptive son Bertil and their adoptive-father. Linda, the mother, was pregnant and the major issue was if their child would be a boy or a girl. The baby in the womb was called "broster" (a combination of bror and syster, i.e. brother and sister). The family also fought pollution and shopping hysteria.

The series has been referred to as a 1970s version of the Christmas gospel, where the characters move out into the countryside.

Later 
The series is one of the titles in the 2009 book Tusen svenska klassiker (2009). Reruns aired between 23 February-6 April 1982.

References

External links 
 
 

1971 radio programme debuts
1971 radio programme endings
1971 Swedish television series debuts
1971 Swedish television series endings
Sveriges Radio's Christmas Calendar
Sveriges Television's Christmas calendar